Kushwaha Shivpujan Mehta is the Jharkhand state legislative assembly member from Hussainabad (Vidhan Sabha constituency). In the 2014 general election, he was elected as MLA as Bahujan Samaj Party candidate. He joined All Jharkhand Students Union in November 2019, and is now District level chairman of All India Kushwaha Mahasabha, Hazaribagh from 15 December 2020.

He has 5 criminal cases against him with charges of criminal intimidation, bribery, voluntarily causing grievous hurt etc.

References 

Members of the Jharkhand Legislative Assembly
Living people
Bahujan Samaj Party politicians
All Jharkhand Students Union politicians
1972 births